Dr. Abdelsalam (Sumi) Helal is a computer scientist who was born in Suez, Egypt. He graduated from Alexandria University in 1982. He is best known for his work in  Pervasive Computing, Mobile computing and the Internet of Things, and their human-centric applications in the domains of aging, personal health and disability. He is a professor at the Computer and Information Science and Engineering Department (CISE) at the University of Florida and the director of its Mobile and Pervasive Computing Laboratory 

Dr. Helal currently serves as the editor-in-chief of IEEE Computer. He was an Associate Editor in Chief and an editorial board member of the IEEE Pervasive Computing magazine. He has published extensively (Google Scholar), and founded four successful startups. His detailed profile can be found here

Projects

Professor Helal has worked as a principal investigator on several projects funded by public and private research institutes including the National Science Foundation, the Department of Education, the National Institute of Health, IBM, Microsoft, Motorola, Intel, Sun Microsystems, and ETRI among others. These funded projects are mainly focused on peer to peer mobile computing models, mobile database design, access and transactions, mobile networks and commerce, power-awareness in computing, among others.

Patents

Professor Helal has filled several patents some of which are published (available from here) and others are issued (available from here)

Selected bibliography

References

3. "Software Foundation for Critical Pervasive Computing" - Information Technologies and Electronics International Congress Digit 2007 (Conference in Puebla, Mexico).

Ubiquitous computing researchers
Living people
University of Florida faculty
Alexandria University alumni
Year of birth missing (living people)